Elections to Cumbria County Council were held on 7 May 1981. This was on the same day as other UK county council elections. The council size was increased to 83 members following a boundary review. The Labour Party gained control of the council from the Conservative Party.

Results

References

Cumbria
1981
1980s in Cumbria